Huron City School District is a public school district serving students in the city of Huron, Ohio, United States. The school district enrolls 1,569 students as of the 2012–2013 academic year.

Schools

Elementary school
Shawnee Elementary Schools (Grades Kindergarten through 2nd)

Intermediate school
Woodlands Intermediate School (Grades 3rd through 6th)

Middle school
McCormick Middle School (Grades 7th and 8th)

High school
Huron High School (Grades 9th through 12th)

References

External links
Huron City School District website

School districts in Ohio
Education in Erie County, Ohio
School District